The Samsø Common List (Danish: Fælleslisten Samsø), formerly The Samsø List (Danish: Samsø-Listen), is a local political party set in Samsø Municipality on the island of Samsø. Inge-Dorthe Larsen is currently representing the party in the municipal council of Samsø Municipality.

History
In 2001, 7 candidates ran for The Samsø List. The party got two seats in the municipal council in Samsø Municipality, by receiving 16.66% of the votes.
In 2005, they lost one of those seats, by going back to 7.4% of the votes. This resulted in a single seat.
In 2009, the party received 4.7% of the votes. After this election, "The Samsø List" changed the name to "Fælleslisten Samsø".
With four candidates in 2013, Samsø Common List received 10.8% of the votes, resulting in a single seat.

Election results

Municipal elections

References

Local political parties in Denmark
Political parties with year of establishment missing